The Helsinki Institute of Physics (HIP) is a physics research institute operated jointly by University of Helsinki, Aalto University, University of Jyväskylä, Lappeenranta University of Technology and Tampere University of Technology. The operations of the institute began on September 1, 1996. The foundation of the institute was provided by the three previous Helsinki-based institutes: SEFT, TFT (University of Helsinki) and HTI (Helsinki University of Technology), which were merged into the new organization. The current director of the institute since 2017 has been prof. Katri Huitu. The institute is responsible for the Finnish research collaboration with CERN and Facility for Antiproton and Ion Research in Europe GmbH (FAIR).

The research is currently focused on following fields:
 Theory Programme
 Nuclear Structure for Weak and Astrophysical Processes
 QCD and Strongly Interacting Gauge Theory
 Domain Wall Dynamics
 Cosmology of the Early and Late Universe
 High Energy Phenomenology in the LHC Era
 CMS Programme
 CMS Experiment 
 CMS Upgrade 
 Tier-2 Operations 
 TOTEM 
 Technology Programme
 Accelerator Technology
 Green Big Data Project
 Biomedical Imaging
 Novel Instrumentation for Nuclear Safety, Security and Safeguards
 Finnish Business Incubation Center of CERN Technologies
 Nuclear Matter Programme
 ALICE
 ISOLDE
 FAIR

References

External links
 HIP website 

Research institutes in Finland
Buildings and structures in Helsinki
University of Helsinki
Physics institutes
Institutes associated with CERN